James Dundas White (10 July 1866 – 30 April 1951), known as J. D. White, was a Scottish Liberal Party politician.  He was Member of Parliament (MP) from 1906 to 1918, with a short break in 1911.

Background
White was the nephew of Lord Overtoun. Born in Rutherglen, his family operated the J&J White Chemicals factory in the town.

Politics
He was elected at the 1906 general election as Liberal MP for Dunbartonshire. 

He was re-elected in January 1910. 

In 1910 he was appointed Parliamentary Private Secretary to Lord Pentland the Secretary of State for Scotland. He did not stand at the December 1910 general election.

He returned to the House of Commons seven months later, when he was elected at the 1911 Glasgow Tradeston by-election. 

He was one of a group of radical Liberal MPs called the Single Taxers, who favoured land reform. They had some success in persuading Liberal Chancellor of the Exchequer David Lloyd George who integrated some of their views into his 1913-14 land campaign. White favoured the introduction of Land value taxation and wrote extensively on the subject. 
In 1912 when Thomas McKinnon Wood took over as Secretary of State for Scotland, White continued as his PPS. He remained as PPS to McKinnon Wood in his other roles until he left office in 1916. He was Chairman of one and member of several other Departmental Committees during the European War.
At the general election in 1918, White did not receive the Coalition Coupon and was defeated by a Unionist supporter of Lloyd George's coalition government.

In 1919 along with a number of other Single Taxers, he left the Liberal party and joined the Independent Labour Party. He did not contest the 1922 General election. At the 1923 General Election he contested Middlesbrough West.

At the 1924 General Election he contested Glasgow Central.

In 1926 he became disillusioned with the failure of the Labour party to commit to land reform and resigned from the Labour party. He did not contested any further parliamentary elections.

References

External links 
 

1866 births
1951 deaths
Scottish Liberal Party MPs
Members of the Parliament of the United Kingdom for Scottish constituencies
Members of the Parliament of the United Kingdom for Glasgow constituencies
UK MPs 1906–1910
UK MPs 1910
UK MPs 1910–1918
Labour Party (UK) parliamentary candidates
Politicians from South Lanarkshire
People from Rutherglen